Zhi Yao was a Kushan Buddhist monk of Yuezhi ethnicity. He was involved with the translation of Buddhist texts into Chinese around 185 CE. His origin is described in his adopted Chinese surname Zhi, abbreviation of Yuezhi.

Zhi Yao was a student of Lokaksema. He translated the Mahayana text: The Sutra on the Completion  of Brightness  into Chinese.

See also
Silk Road transmission of Buddhism

References

Further reading
 Nattier, Jan (2008). A Guide to the Earliest Chinese Buddhist Translations: Texts from the Eastern Han and Three Kingdoms Periods, Bibliotheca Philologica et Philosophica, IRIAB Vol. X, 94-102;

External links
Texts associated with Zhi Yao

Han dynasty Buddhist monks
Buddhist monks from the Western Regions